The Thai Ambassador in Washington, D.C. is the official representative of the Government in Bangkok to the Government of the United States.

List of representatives

 United States–Thailand relations

References 

 
United States
Thailand